The 2000–01 Syracuse Orangemen basketball team represented Syracuse University during the 2000–01 NCAA men's basketball season.

Roster

Schedule and results

References

Syracuse Orange men's basketball seasons
Syracuse
Syracuse
Syracuse Orange men's b
Syracuse Orange men's b